Vista Alternative High School (VAHS) is an alternative high school in Yuma, Arizona, Arizona, United States. It opened in 1991 and is part of the Yuma Union High School District. The school mascot is the Lobo.

History
VAHS was designed to support students who are at-risk of dropping out of high school and those who have had difficulties at other schools. VAHS is normally only open to Juniors and Seniors, but in the past few years a small number of Sophomores have been admitted. Daily attendance at the school numbers around 200, allowing for a small school environment and smaller teacher-to-student ratios.

Academics
VAHS offers diverse course options for its students including all core academic classes required by state law, as well as: art classes, culinary arts courses, sociology, marketing and hospitality courses. Additionally, an online academy is offered for students to take web-based courses on three days each week. During these sessions, students work independently but are supervised and supported by staff.

References

External links 
 Vista Alternative High School Website

Public high schools in Arizona
Schools in Yuma County, Arizona
Yuma, Arizona